This is a list of Portuguese winter football transfers for the 2009–10 season. The winter transfer window opened on 1 January 2010 and closed on 31 January 2010. Players could be bought before the transfer window opened, but were not permitted to join their new clubs until 1 January. Additionally, players without a club could join at any time and clubs were able to sign a goalkeeper on an emergency loan if they had no registered goalkeeper available. Only moves involving Primeira Liga clubs are listed; included are clubs that completed transfers after the end of the summer 2009 transfer window and before the end of the 2009–10 winter window.

Transfers

 Some players may have been bought after the end of the 2009 summer transfer window in Portugal but before the end of that country's transfer window closed.

References

2009–10 in Portuguese football
Football transfers winter 2009–10
Lists of Portuguese football transfers